Haji Yusuf Barre was the commander at the battle of Jidbali, the largest and deadliest engagement between the dervishes and the British empire in the Horn of Africa. Haji Yusuf Barre is also noted for being the person whom held the last stand at the Dhulbahante garesa at Taleh, in the aftermath of the bombings at Taleh wherein Taleh became the first place to be targeted in Africa through aerial attacks.

Jidbali Battle
A report by General Egerton reported that 1200 darawiish in total were killed and that Haji Yusuf Barre commanded the dervishes:

Total estimated to exceed 1,200. Rout was complete, and no Dervish has been seen in the neighbourhood since, except small party from south. Prisoners and deserters state as follows:—Some 5,000 Dervishes present at fight, with 1,000 rifles and 300 ponies. Haji Yussuf Dolbahanta commanded

The report also states that the darawiish infantry commander and the darawiish cavalry commander were both killed in the Jidbali battle, as well as four other major leaders, bringing to 6 the major darawiish leaders killed at Jidbali; it further states that Haji Yusuf Barre, whilst being general commander, barely escaped with his life:

Haji Yussuf Dolbahanta commanded, and escaped. His two leaders of foot and horse were killed, also four men of note

The report further states that the Sayid himself was at Xudun (Hudin):

Orders were to hold Jidballi to the last. The Mullah, with a large force, was said to be near Hudin during fight

Fall of Silsilad

Controversy
The Cigaal family, of the Ali Geri subclan of Reer Khair Dhulbahante, and the maternal relatives of the Sayid Muhammad Abdullah Hassan were one of the most powerful families within the Darawiish. This can be deduced from the fact that it had more known members within the Darawiish government, than arguably any other family.

Prelude
Much of the native Somali citations on the development of Darawiish headquarters and the construction of Darawiish bases comes from the citations of Darawiish veterans such as Ciise Faarax Fikad and Aw Cabdille Ibrahim. Aw Abdallah Ibraahiim is from the Xasan Ugaas the city of Boocame in Somalia, and he lived to see Somali independence. During his old age, he relayed his memories of poems by the Sayyid.

Aw Abdille Ibrahim

Aw Abdille Ibraahiim was the overseer of the northern Cal coast of the Darawiish and was an advisor, or khusuusi. During the aftermath of a British Royal Air Force bombardment of Taleh, Aw Ibraahiim was asked by the Sayyid, the leader of the Darawiish, to advise on movement. They fled the Jidali air raids on 21 January 1920, thus Jidali becoming the first place in Africa to be bombed via aircraft. In his discussion with the Sayyid, Aw Ibraahiim was given the final say on what the Darawiish should do next. He disagreed with suggestions that the Darwiish remnants should go to Abyssinia (now-Ethiopians), Italians, and people of Harar, but agreed with the haroun that they follow the tributary of the Shebelle River westwards, in modern-day Ethiopia. Once they reached the tributary, Aw Abdille sent letters to two Oromo kings, of the Duube and Aruusa respectively. In it he asks for refuge for the Darawiish who had fled the assault by British and Italian colonialists. They later held a meeting and accepted providing refuge on the condition that they betroth their daughters to the king. A couple of months later, in December 1920, Abshir Dhoore hosted a meeting of 4 of the most senior Darawiish leaders, which included Aw Ibraahiim. Here, Dhoore informed the men that the Sayyid passed away. During the withdrawal from Taleh, the capital of the Darawiish, the Sayyid along with Aw Abdille Ibraahiim and Cismaan Boos entered the southern rural parts of Beretabli, in an area called Dodhais. As such, Cismaan Boos and Aw Cabdille Ibraahiim were the last two men to have accompanied the Sayyid prior to his flight from the Darawiish homeland. A school in Boocame has been named after Aw Ibraahiim.

Last man standing
Haji Yusuf Barre was also the last man standing at Taleh in February 1920. The battle between Yusuf Barre and the British troops is known to be the last military engagement to occur between the darawiish and the British in their original territories. A witness gave the following account of the battle between Haji Yusuf Barre and the British colonial army:

British general Gibb noted that capturing the fort became uncomplicated primarily as it had only one defender, in Haji Yusuf Barre:

He himself, finding the forts lightly held, attacked with all available men. General panic ensued. Men, women, and children rushed precipitately out of the forts and by 7 p.m. the Tribal Levy were in occupation of part of the fortress. A number of riflemen, however, remained in two of the forts, some of whom escaped during the night, others surrendering in the morning. It was most fortunate that Tale was so easily captured

Silsilad castellans

Mohamud Hosh
Native Somali sources have reported how Mohamud Xoosh Cigaal, often anglicised as Mohamud Hosh, was the last adult resident of Taleh fort, as such the last castellan of Silsilad:

Maxamuud Xoosh Cigaal was also described as being among the heads of the Darawiish government in Somali sources and Xoosh Cigaal described the demoralizing effects of British war planes attacking the Taleh fort in detail:

Maxamuud Xoosh Cigaal is one of the most important native African sources on interactions and tactics used between Europeans and Africans from the era of the Scramble for Africa, particularly in the Horn of Africa. One example that Xoosh speaks about is what he calls the forged letter from his former mentor Salah which he describes as propaganda forged by the British and Italians.

A 1999 book published by Indiana University also shortlists Mohamud Hosh as one of only a few known Somali government figures from the pre-colonial era, and further lists him as one of the only Somali politicians from the precolonial era to have documented precolonial customs and conventions within the Horn of Africa. The interviews continued from 1971 up to 1973.

A report from the University of Michigan states that in the early 1970s Maxamuud Xoosh Cigaal, which is latinized as Mohamud Hosh in English sources, was being interviewed whilst in his old age by a Somali research commission who sought to study British tactics vis-a-vis native African rebels towards colonialism. In this study, Maxamuud Xoosh reports how the European colonialists used divide et impera or divide and conquer tactics in order to subdue African natives and the counter-measures the native Africans took. The report also states that Maxamuud Xoosh or Hosh hails from the city of Buuhoodle.

Jama Biixi Kidin
The last resident of Silsilad overall, and thereby the last extant Darawiish is Jaamac Biixi Kidin, who although being the last Darawiish present at the Silsilad fort, was a 6 year old child when the fort was captured on 9 February 1920. A British war report describes Jaamac Biixi Kidin as being the lone individual present inside the fort. Due to his immediate arrest, Jaamac Biixi Kidin is also the first Somali child prisoner in history:

A news report by Golkhaatumo journalist Asad Cadaani confirms that Jaamac Biixi Kidin was the last known Darawiish person to be extant at the fort, although only 6 years old. It also states that Jaamac Biixi Kidin was the last known Darawiish to still be alive when he died in the year 2009.

According to Jaamac Biixi Kidin, by the time the air strikes were made against Darawiish, the Darawiish were exclusively made up of the Dhulbahante clan.

Personal life
The report by Egerton states that Haji Yusuf Barre, also called Sheik Yusuf hailed from the Dhulbahante tribe. He was killed in 1920 by a man named Abdi Dheere Shihiri, purportedly due to vengeance with a letter exchanged between the Sayid's camp and the British stating it was "because he alleges he killed 60 of his people", meaning the Habar Yoonis tribe that Shihiri belonged to. However, the Sayid stated that this allegation was a fabrication. The Sayid personally referred to him as commander of the Miinanle division, stating, Mahiiggaankan wada jira Miinanloo iskaafiya Yuusuf baa u maqadina, meaning, during this downpour, Miinanle be self-sufficient, Yusuf is its commander.

References

Somali nationalists
1850s births
1920 deaths